Jerez de la Frontera Cathedral is a Catholic church located in Jerez de la Frontera, Andalusia, southern Spain. It is the seat of the Roman Catholic Diocese of Asidonia-Jerez. It was declared Bien de Interés Cultural in 1931.

Style 

Built in the 17th century, it is a mix of Gothic, Baroque and Neoclassical style. It was elevated to the rank of cathedral in 1980.

Interior 

The cathedral is on a central plan with a nave and four aisles of uneven height. The building is supported externally by normal and flying buttresses and crossing the transept is a dome.

The interior houses a Virgin Mary by Francisco Zurbarán, and a late 15th-century Gothic Crucifix (named Cristo de la Viga).

Gallery

See also 
 List of Bien de Interés Cultural in the Province of Cádiz

References

External links 

 Official site

17th-century Roman Catholic church buildings in Spain
Jerez
Bien de Interés Cultural landmarks in the Province of Cádiz
Churches in Jerez de la Frontera
Gothic architecture in Andalusia
Baroque architecture in Andalusia